Niagara conference may refer to:

 Niagara Bible Conference, held 1876 to 1897
 Niagara Falls conference, held 1905
 Niagara Falls peace conference, held 1914